The 2019 FIBA Under-16 Women's Americas Championship was an international basketball competition held in Puerto Aysén, Chile from 16–22 June 2019. It was the sixth edition of the FIBA Under-16 Women's Americas Championship, and the first to be hosted in Chile.

The United States defeated Canada, 87–37, in the final game to reclaim the championship. Meanwhile, the hosts Chile edged Puerto Rico in the bronze medal game, 59–49. The top four teams qualified for the 2020 FIBA Under-17 Women's Basketball World Cup in Romania.

Venue

Qualified teams 
North America

South America: 2018 South American U15 Women's Championship in Puerto Aysén, Chile from 29 October to 3 November 2018
 (host)

Central America:

Draw
The draw was held on 30 April 2019 in San Juan, Puerto Rico.

Group phase
All times are local (UTC–4).

Group A

Group B

Knockout stage

Bracket

Quarterfinals

5–8th place semifinals

Semifinals

Seventh place game

Fifth place game

Third place game

Final

Final ranking

Awards

All-Tournament Team
 Payton Verhulst (MVP)
 Lauren Betts
 Sonia Cintron
 Isaline Alexander
 Fernanda Ovalle

References

External links
 Official website

FIBA Americas Under-16 Championship for Women
2019 in women's basketball
2018–19 in North American basketball
2018–19 in South American basketball
International women's basketball competitions hosted by Chile
Youth sport in Chile
June 2019 sports events in South America